Rudra, also credited as  Ashwini, is an Indian actress who has appeared in  Malayalam, Telugu, and Tamil films and serials. She made her acting debut with the 1991 Tamil film Pudhu Nellu Pudhu Naathu. She has acted only in few films, but her roles in
Kauravar (1992), Manichitrathazhu (1993), Kizhakku Cheemayile (1993) Dhruvam (1993), Pidakkozhi Koovunna Noottaandu (1994) and Kudumbakodathi (1996) are well noted.

Early life
When Ashwini was in final year of school, she did a couple of modeling assignments along with her classmates, for a Malayalam magazine. Director Bharathiraja saw the magazine and offered her the role in Pudhu Nellu Pudhu Naathu.

Now she lives in Singapore acting in Singapore serials.

Career
Rudra made her debut in the Tamil film Pudhu Nellu Pudhu Naathu, directed by Bharathiraja. She had done about 16 films in Malayalam.

Filmography

TV serials
Tamil

 Malayalam

 Telugu

References

External links

 Rudra at MSI

Actresses in Malayalam cinema
Indian film actresses
Actresses in Tamil cinema
Year of birth missing (living people)
Living people
Indian television actresses
Actresses in Malayalam television
20th-century Indian actresses
Actresses in Telugu cinema
Actresses in Tamil television
Actresses in Telugu television
Actresses in Hindi cinema